Varize may refer to the following places in France:

 Varize, Eure-et-Loir, a commune in the Eure-et-Loir department
 Varize, Moselle, a commune in the Moselle department